Jane Craven (born January 25, 1875 in India, but lived primarily in Chicago, Illinois) was an American tennis player of the end of the 19th century.

Notably, she won the 1899 US Women's National Championship in women's doubles with Myrtle McAteer.

Grand Slam finals

Doubles (1 title)

Mixed doubles (1 runner-up)

Other finals

Doubles (1 runner-up)

References

Date of birth unknown
Date of death unknown
19th-century American women
19th-century female tennis players
American female tennis players
United States National champions (tennis)
Year of death missing
Year of birth missing
Place of birth missing
Grand Slam (tennis) champions in women's doubles